Gertrud Berger (15 December 1870 – 26 December 1949) was a German painter of landscapes and still life associated with the town of Greifswald.

Life

Berger was born in 1870 in Bergen auf Rügen. She was the second child of Marie Wilhelmine Friederike Tiburtius and her husband Carl Wilhelm Ferdinand Berger, a lawyer and notary. She was baptized on 1 February 1871 at her home by the deacon of the St Mary's Church (Bergen), Bublitz.

Gertrud Berger studied in Berlin where she was a student of Max Uth, L. Meyer, and Ernst Kolbe (1876-1945). Her subjects were landscapes and still lifes. Afterwards she lived and worked in Greifswald.

Berger died in Greifswald in 1949, and her tombstone is in the Greifswald New Cemetery.

Works 

 Portrait of a Child
 On the coast
 Dorfstrasse in Wieck near Greifswald
 Sailing ship in front of pine-covered cliffs
 Domstrasse in Greifswald
 North German landscape with windmill and goatherd
 Sailing ship off Usedom

References

1870 births
1949 deaths
People from Bergen auf Rügen
19th-century German painters
People from Greifswald
20th-century German painters
Landscape painters
Still life painters
German women painters
19th-century German women artists
20th-century German women artists